André Brie (born 13 March 1950 in Schwerin, Mecklenburg-Vorpommern) is a German politician and from 1999 to 2009 Member of the European Parliament for the Party of Democratic Socialism, part of the European Left and sits on the European Parliament's Committee on Foreign Affairs.

He is also a substitute for the Committee on Petitions and the Committee on the Internal Market and Consumer Protection.

Outside Parliament he is a member of the PDS regional party council in Mecklenburg-Western Pomerania.

Education
 1968: Skilled tool-maker
 1976: Degree in political science
 1979: Dr.rer.pol.
 1985: Dr.sc.pol.

Career
 1976-1983: Academic assistant at the Institute for International Relations, Potsdam-Babelsberg (IIB)
 1983-1986: senior assistant at the IIB
 1986-1989: lecturer and assistant professor at the IIB
 1990: Lecturer at the Humboldt University, Berlin
 1990-1999: Staff Member of the PDS Executive Committee, and PDS election campaign manager
 1990-1992: Deputy chairman of the PDS
 since 2003: Member of the Mecklenburg-Vorpommern Land executive of the PDS
 since 1999: Member of the European Parliament

See also
 2004 European Parliament election in Germany

External links
 
 

1950 births
Living people
People from Schwerin
Socialist Unity Party of Germany politicians
Party of Democratic Socialism (Germany) politicians
The Left (Germany) politicians
MEPs for Germany 2004–2009
MEPs for Germany 1999–2004
The Left (Germany) MEPs
People of the Stasi